Comedy Playhouse is a long-running British anthology series of one-off unrelated sitcoms that aired for 127 episodes from 1961 to 1975. Many episodes later graduated to their own series, including Steptoe and Son, Meet the Wife, Till Death Us Do Part, All Gas and Gaiters, Up Pompeii!, Not in Front of the Children, Me Mammy, That's Your Funeral, The Liver Birds, Are You Being Served? and particularly Last of the Summer Wine, which is the world's longest running sitcom, having run from January 1973 to August 2010. In all, 27 sitcoms started from a pilot in the Comedy Playhouse strand. 

In March 2014, it was announced that Comedy Playhouse would make a return that year with three new episodes. Two further series each comprising three episodes were broadcast in 2016 and 2017 respectively.

Background
The series began in 1961 at the prompting of Tom Sloan, Head of BBC Light Entertainment at the time. Galton and Simpson were no longer writing for Tony Hancock and Sloan asked them to write ten one-offs with the hope that one might become established as a series. Thus, the first two series of Comedy Playhouse were written by Ray Galton and Alan Simpson, but from the third series onwards, the episodes were written by various writers including the likes of Barry Took, Bernard McKenna, Bob Larbey, Brian Cooke, Carla Lane, Craig Cash, David Croft, Dick Clement, Dick Hills, Doug Naylor, Edwin Apps, George Evans, Graham Chapman, Harry Driver, Jack Docherty, Jack Rosenthal, Jeremy Lloyd, John Esmonde, John T. Chapman, Johnny Speight, Ian La Frenais, Ken Hoare, Kingsley Amis, Jilly Cooper, Marty Feldman, Michael Pertwee, Neil Shand, Pauline Devaney, Peter Jones, P.G. Wodehouse, Richard Harris, Ronald Chesney, Ronald Woolfe, Roy Clarke, Richard Waring, Sid Green and Vince Powell.

Archive Status 
The first eight series were made in black and white, with the rest from Up Pompeii! onwards being in colour. Like many television programmes from the time, many of 1960s & 1970s episodes are lost. As a result, 95 episodes are currently missing from the archives, although audio recordings from the soundtracks of 15 missing episodes have been recovered, short extracts survive from Till Death Us Do Part and Thank You Sir, Thank You Madam, and a further episode The Melting Pot surives as a U-Matic video copy.  

In Australia the series was broadcast on ABC Television in the early 1960s-late 1970s.

Commercial Release 
The series itself hasn't been released on home media, although some of the surviving episodes have been repeated on television or included on DVD boxsets as pilot episodes to their respective series. These include Steptoe and Son (The Offer), Meet The Wife (The Bed), All Gas and Gaiters (The Bishop Rides Again), Up Pompeii!, Are You Being Served?, Last of the Summer Wine (Of Funerals and Fish) and Happy Ever After. Clips from the series were also featured in the documentary Comedy Playhouse: Where It All Began, which was broadcast on BBC1 on 29 April 2014,  which featured interviews with actors and writers who participated in the series, including Ray Galton, Alan Simpson, June Whitfield, Bernard Cribbins and Keith Barron.

Episodes

Series 1 (1961–2)

Series 2 (1963)

Series 3 (1963-4)

Series 4 (1965)

Series 5 (1966)

Series 6 (1967)

Series 7 (1968)

Series 8 (1969)

Series 9 (1969-70)

Series 10 (1970)

Series 11 (1971)

Series 12 (1972)

Series 13 (1973)

Series 14 (1974)

Series 15 (1975)

Revived Series

Series 16 (2014)

Series 17 (2016)

Series 18 (2017)

Scottish Comedy Playhouse
The BBC aired six comedy pilots in 1970 in Scotland only under the title Scottish Comedy Playhouse, none of which developed onto a full series. While these were being aired, Monty Python's Flying Circus was broadcast in the rest of the UK. All episodes from this series were wiped soon after transmission and are currently missing from the archives. The episodes are as follows:

See also

 Galton and Simpson Comedy - a six part anthology series of stories written by Ray Galton and Alan Simpson, produced by London Weekend Televsion, that aired on the ITV network in 1969
 Six Dates with Barker - a six part anthology series featuring sitcom pilots starring Ronnie Barker, produced by London Weekend Televsion, that aired on the ITV network in 1971.
 The Comedy Game - an Australian sitcom anthology series that aired on ABC between 1971-3. 
 Seven of One - a seven part anthology series featuring sitcom pilots starring Ronnie Barker that aired on BBC2 in 1973.
 Cilla's Comedy Six - an anthology series of comedic stories starring Cilla Black, produced by ATV, that aired on the ITV network between 1975-6.
 The Sound of Laughter - a six part of anthology series of sitcom pilots produced by ATV, that aired on the ITV network in 1977.
 The Galton and Simpson Playhouse - a seven part anthology series of sitcom pilots written by Ray Galton and Alan Simpson, produced by Yorkshire Television, that aired on the ITV network in 1977.
 The Comic Strip Presents... - an anthology series of one off comedic stories that aired on Channel 4 and BBC2 between 1982-2016.
 Murder Most Horrid - a black comedy anthology series featuring comedic stories starring Dawn French, that aired on BBC2 between 1991-9.
 ITV Comedy Playhouse - a eight part anthology series of sitcom pilots produced by Carlton Television, that aired on the ITV network in 1993. 
 Paul Merton in Galton and Simpson's... – an anthology series of comedic stories starring Paul Merton, based on scripts by Ray Galton and Alan Simpson, produced by Central Television, that aired on the ITV network between 1996-7.

Notes

References
Mark Lewisohn, "Radio Times Guide to TV Comedy", BBC Worldwide Ltd, 2003
British TV Comedy Guide for Comedy Playhouse

External links
Comedy Playhouse at Television Heaven

Comedy Playhouse at British Comedy Guide

 
1961 British television series debuts
2014 British television series debuts
2017 British television series endings
1960s British comedy television series
1970s British comedy television series
2010s British comedy television series
1960s British anthology television series
1970s British anthology television series
1980s British anthology television series
BBC television comedy
Lost BBC episodes
Black-and-white British television shows
English-language television shows